Gobiopsis malekulae, the striped barbelgoby, is a species of goby found in the Western Central Pacific Ocean.

Size

Etymology
The fish is named in honor of Malekula Island, Vanuatu,.

References

Gobiidae
Taxa named by Albert William Herre
Fish described in 1935